is a former Japanese football player.

Playing career
Hiramoto was born in Tokyo on November 21, 1974. After graduating from Horikoshi High School, he played for Omiya Ardija. The club was promoted to the new J2 League in 1999. He played many matches as forward and retired at the end of the 1999 season.

Club statistics

References

External links

1974 births
Living people
Horikoshi High School alumni
Association football people from Tokyo
Japanese footballers
J2 League players
Omiya Ardija players
Association football forwards